The 1972–73 Yugoslav First League season was the 27th season of the First Federal League of Yugoslavia, the top level association football competition of SFR Yugoslavia, since its establishment in 1946. A total of 18 teams competed in the league, with the previous season's runners-up Red Star winning the title.

Teams
A total of eighteen teams contested the league, including sixteen sides from the 1971–72 season and two sides promoted from the 1971–72 Yugoslav Second League (YSL) as winners of the two second level divisions East and West. The league was contested in a double round robin format, with each club playing every other club twice, for a total of 34 rounds. Two points were awarded for wins and one point for draws.

Radnički Kragujevac and NK Maribor were relegated from the 1971–72 Yugoslav First League after finishing the season in bottom two places of the league table.  The two clubs promoted to top level were Bor and Spartak Subotica.

League table

Results

Winning squad
Champions
Red Star Belgrade

Zoran Antonijević
Jovan Aćimović
Zoran Bingulac
Vladislav Bogićević
Kiro Dojčinovski
Ratomir Dujković
Milovan Đorić
Slobodan Janković
Živorad Jeftić
Nikola Jovanović
Stanislav Karasi 
Mihalj Keri
Branko Klenkovski
Petar Krivokuća
Vojin Lazarević
Dušan Nikolić
Mile Novković
Miroslav Pavlović
Aleksandar Panajotović
Vladimir Petrović 
Ognjan Petrović 
Sead Sušić
Zoran Filipović 
Dragan Džajić

Top scorers

See also
1972–73 Yugoslav Second League

External links

Yugoslavia Domestic Football Full Tables

Yugoslav First League seasons
Yugo
1972–73 in Yugoslav football